Jordi Xumetra Feliú (born 24 October 1985) is a Spanish professional footballer who plays as a right winger for UE Olot.

Club career
Born in L'Estartit, Girona, Catalonia, Xumetra finished his development at FC Barcelona, but only played for Tercera División clubs in his first years as senior. In 2006, he signed with Girona FC also in that league, being part of the squads that achieved two consecutive promotions in two years.

On 30 August 2008, Xumetra appeared in his first match as a professional, coming on as a late substitute in a 1–0 away win over RC Celta de Vigo in the Segunda División. His first goal came on 14 February of the following year, as he scored his side's last in a 3–3 home draw against Albacete Balompié.

Xumetra moved to Elche CF also of the second tier on 3 July 2010. He scored seven goals in his second year, repeating the feat the following season as the Valencian Community side returned to La Liga after 24 years.

On 5 June 2013, Xumetra joined Levante UD on a three-year contract. He made his top-flight debut on 18 August, starting in a 7–0 loss at Barcelona. He scored his only goal in the Spanish top division on 29 September, the game's only in an away victory over CA Osasuna. 

On 13 July 2016, Xumetra agreed to a two-year deal with Real Zaragoza as a free agent. He continued to play well into his 30s in the lower leagues or amateur football, with UE Olot (two spells) and UE Costa Brava.

Honours
Girona
Segunda División B: 2007–08

Elche
Segunda División: 2012–13

References

External links

1985 births
Living people
People from Baix Empordà
Sportspeople from the Province of Girona
Spanish footballers
Footballers from Catalonia
Association football wingers
La Liga players
Segunda División players
Segunda División B players
Tercera División players
Segunda Federación players
Tercera Federación players
RCD Espanyol B footballers
Girona FC players
Elche CF players
Levante UD footballers
Real Zaragoza players
UE Olot players
UE Costa Brava players
Catalonia international footballers